Burmese ceramics refers to ceramic art and pottery designed or produced as a form of Burmese art. The tradition of Burmese ceramics dates back to the third millennium BCE. Pottery and ceramics were an essential part of the trade between Myanmar and its neighbours.

The village of Kyaukmyaung (Sagaing) is an important traditional production centre.

See also 
Khmer ceramics
Lao ceramics
Thai ceramics
Vietnamese ceramics

External links 
 
 https://www.seaceramic.org.sg/resources/the-ceramics-of-southeast-asia/myanmar-ceramics/
 http://scholarspace.manoa.hawaii.edu/bitstream/handle/10125/17147/AP-v40n1-108-118.pdf?sequence=1 
 http://www.koh-antique.com/sea%20exhibition/myanmarceramics.htm

Burmese art
History of ceramics
Pottery by country